Martin Roy Pringle (born, 18 August 1964) is a New Zealand cricketer. He was born in Auckland and educated at St Peter's College, Auckland. He played cricket for the Ellerslie Cricket Club.

As a cricketer he played 33 First-class and 29 List A matches for Auckland in 1984–1993. In 1987-88 he scored the slowest fifty for Auckland against Northern Districts in the Plunket Shield at Seddon Park.

See also
 List of Auckland representative cricketers

References

1964 births
People educated at St Peter's College, Auckland
New Zealand cricketers
Auckland cricketers
Living people